Sarah Dunlap (born June 26, 1980) is an American bodybuilder. In 2007, she won the Jan Tana Classic in the lightweight and overall categories and was placed ninth at the Ms. Olympia competition. She works at a supplement store as a personal trainer.

Contest history 
2007 IFBB Ms. Olympia – 9th
2007 IFBB Jan Tana Classic – 1st
2006 IFBB Europa Super Show – 13th
2005 IFBB Charlotte Pro – 3rd
2005 IFBB New York Pro – 4th
2002 NPC  Junior National Championships - 1st
2002 NPC  National Championships - 1st
2002 Ms. Pittsburgh Heavyweight 1st Place and Overall winner
2001 NPC  Pittsburgh Championships - (Middleweight)  - 1st

References 

1980 births
American female bodybuilders
Living people
Professional bodybuilders
21st-century American women